Estanque de Pando is a northern suburb of Pando in the Canelones Department of southern Uruguay.

Geography

Location
It lies between the suburbs San Bernardo - Viejo Molino and Jardines de Pando.

Population
In 2011 Estanque de Pando had a population of 770.
 
Source: Instituto Nacional de Estadística de Uruguay

References

External links
INE map of Pando, Estanque de Pando, Jardines de Pando and Viejo Molino

Populated places in the Canelones Department